Araponga is a Brazilian municipality located in the state of Minas Gerais. Its population  is estimated to be 8,453 people living in an elevation of 1,040 meters. The area of the municipality is 304.421 km². The city belongs to the mesoregion of Zona da Mata and to the microregion of Viçosa.

See also
 List of municipalities in Minas Gerais

References

Municipalities in Minas Gerais